The qualification for the Field hockey at the 2016 Summer Olympics was held from September 2014 to October 2015. There were three qualification events, host country, continental championship, and 2014–15 FIH Hockey World League Semifinals respectively. Total twelve teams could participated in the 2016 Summer Olympics.

Qualification

Host country
Each of the continental champions received a berth alongside the host Brazil, while another six spots were decided in the 2014–2015 FIH Hockey World League. As the host nation, Brazil had a guaranteed quota place if it satisfiesdthe following performance criteria set by FIH: the women's team should either obtain a world ranking equal to or better than fortieth place by the end of 2014, or not finish lower than seventh at the 2015 Pan American Games. They did not however meet any requirements and thuis did not qualify.
 did not meet any requirements, so the team did not qualify.

Continental Qualification Tournament

Africa

America

Asia

Europe

Oceania

2014–15 World League Semifinals

References

External links
Qualification process

 
Women
Qualification
Field hockey at the Summer Olympics – Women's qualification